Haxe is an open source programming language. Multiple development environments have support for Haxe.

Integrated Development Environments (IDEs)

Availability

Supported Haxe versions, compiler completion, language server

Syntax, parsing, code-assist

Goto, Searching

Code Generation

Refactoring

Hierarchy views

Projects

Build, debug, run

Multi-lingual IDE

Miscellaneous

Text Editors
Multiple text editors, with the help of additional syntax files and some language semantics configuration, support Haxe syntax highlighting and semantics.

 GNU Emacs/XEmacs (in Haxe mode)
 Gedit
 vim with Haxe plugin (Vaxe)
 Atom with Haxe plugin
 EditPlus
 UltraEdit
 Notepad++ (with Haxe syntax file)
 Textmate
 VS Code (with Haxe extension)
 Kate (text editor) & KWrite

References

Integrated development environments